The Royal Netherlands Navy Submarine Service (OZD) is a department within the Royal Netherlands Navy that is responsible for the deployment of Dutch submarines. It was established out of the Netherlands Torpedo Service on 21 December 1906, and merged with the Netherlands Mine Service on 15 July 2005.

History

Early history 
The Royal Netherlands Navy Submarine Service (OZD) was established on 21 December 1906. In this year the Royal Netherlands Navy commissioned its first submarine, . The OZD was tasked with taking care of the equipment of the submarines and the training of the crews.

At this time there were still doubts about the usefulness of submarines. Royal Netherlands Navy officers did indeed see an "interesting and ingeniously constructed mechanism in the vessel," but were hesitant about their practicality. Trial sailing slowly but surely removed the doubts in the naval command. Only under the influence of the First World War did the officers get more interested in the new type of war material.

World War II 
During World War I and the interwar period, the Royal Netherlands Navy ordered and built many submarines. As a result, at the start of World War II, the OZD had more than 20 submarines at its disposal.

Furthermore, seven submarines were in various stages of completion at different yards. On the other hand, the Dutch navy had 15 operational submarines in the Dutch East Indies. These submarines played an important role during the war, by confronting and sinking enemy ships. For example,  and  sunk several Japanese ships in 1941. However, there were also losses in this theater, both HNLMS O 16 and K XVII were sunk in December 1941.

Expansion 

After 1945, the OZD had eight submarines, but due to intensive use in the war these were in a bad condition. Also the fact that the fleet consisted of different classes was a problem. It made maintenance and exercise of crews very pricey. Due to the economic malaise and the high costs caused by operations in the Dutch East Indies, there was no money left for new construction. In the end the navy managed to take four submarines on loan from the British and the Americans.

Since the home port at Den Helder was in ruins, these submarines were for the time being using the Waalhaven in Rotterdam as their base. For the OZD, this period just after World War II meant depending on Dutch pre-war submarines and second-hand British and American submarines. The commissioning of the s in the early 1960s was an important milestone. The four boats formed the backbone of the OZD during a large part of the Cold War; they were in service from 1960 to 1992.

Cold War 
The Dutch submarine fleet never reached the size it had before the World War II again. The new global power relations also generated a new package of tasks. In cooperation with other NATO countries, these are mainly non-attack tasks. Since the Dutch submarines were ideally suited for unnoticed explorations, the OZD was mostly focused on gathering intelligence during the Cold War. This happened, for example, during the West New Guinea dispute in the early 1960s, when three Dutch submarines patroled the Indonesian ports, to warn against possible invasions of West New Guinea.

In the period from 1970 to the 1990s, the crew of the six Dutch submarines secretly gathered information about the Soviet Union. Most of the other missions the OZD carried out remain secret to this day.

Vessels

See also 
 Naval history of the Netherlands

References

Footnotes

Bibliography

External links 

  
 

1906 establishments in the Netherlands
Military units and formations established in 1906
Organisations based in the Netherlands with royal patronage
Submarine
Submarine services